Jasmin Agić (born 26 December 1974) is a Croatian retired football midfielder.

International career
He made his debut for Croatia in a March 1999 friendly match against Greece, coming on as a 61st-minute substitute for Goran Jurić, and earned a total of 14 caps, scoring no goals. His final international was a May 2004 friendly against Slovakia.

International statistics

Match fixing scandal
On 13 December 2011 the player was sentenced to 9 months of prison due to his involvement in match fixing.

Personal life
His wife, Sanja, is also Istrian, from Opatija, and she's the daughter of former football legendary captain of Rijeka, Srećko Juričić. They married in 2000 in his wife's hometown Opatija, and have two sons together.

Honours
Uljanik
3. HNL - West: 1992–93

Dinamo Zagreb
Croatian First Football League: 2002-03, 2006-07
Croatian Football Cup: 2001, 2002, 2004, 2007
Croatian Football Super Cup: 2002, 2003, 2006

References

External links
 

1974 births
Living people
Sportspeople from Pula
Association football midfielders
Croatian footballers
Croatia international footballers
NK Istra 1961 players
HNK Rijeka players
GNK Dinamo Zagreb players
Incheon United FC players
FC Juniors OÖ players
NK Croatia Sesvete players
Croatian Football League players
K League 1 players
Austrian Football Bundesliga players
First Football League (Croatia) players
Croatian expatriate footballers
Expatriate footballers in South Korea
Croatian expatriate sportspeople in South Korea
Expatriate footballers in Austria
Croatian expatriate sportspeople in Austria
Match fixers
Bosniaks of Croatia